Märkisch-Oderland is a Landkreis (district) in the eastern part of Brandenburg, Germany. Neighboring are (from the north clockwise) the district Barnim, the country Poland, the district-free city Frankfurt (Oder), the district Oder-Spree and the Bundesland Berlin. The administrative seat is Seelow but the largest town is Strausberg.

Geography 

The district extends from the outskirts of Berlin in the west to the Oder river and the Polish border in the east. It includes a swampy area along the Oder known as the Oderbruch, about 60 km in length and 17 km in width. The Oderbruch was partially drained and populated in the 18th century. The rest of the district is mainly agricultural land.

History 
The district dates back to the district Lebus and the district Oberbarnim, which were both created in 1816. The district Lebus dates back to the Land Lebus, the region around the town of Lebus. In 1863 Seelow became the seat of the administration of the district Lebus, and in 1950 the district was renamed to Kreis Seelow. In 1952 the districts were split into three parts, the districts Bad Freienwalde, Seelow and Strausberg. In 1993 the three parts were merged to form the current district - the new name refers to Northmarch lands at the Oder river.

Demography

Coat of arms 

The coat of arms shows the eagle of Brandenburg in the upper half. The upper half also resembles the coat of arms of the former district Oberbarnim. In the lower half are two boat-hooks and a star, both taken from the coat of arms of the former district Seelow. The wavy line in the bottom represents the Oder river.

Towns and municipalities

References

External links 

 Märkisch-Oderland official website
 History and infos about Märkisch-Oderland